Elizabeth Forbes (3 August 1924 – 22 October 2014) was an English author, music critic, and musicologist who specialised in writing about opera. Her main areas of interest were 19th- and 20th-century opera (French and Scandinavian in particular) and singers, both historical and present-day. She contributed many reviews and articles to several notable periodicals and newspapers internationally including the Financial Times (which she joined in the early 1970s, working with Andrew Porter and then Ronald Crichton), The Independent, The Musical Times, Opera, Opera Canada and Opera News among several others.

Born in Camberley, she was the author of numerous books on various subjects related to opera, including her 1985 work, Mario and Grisi, which details the lives of opera singers Giulia Grisi and Giovanni Matteo Mario. She wrote a significant number of singing translations of many operas, from French, German and Swedish, including works by Gaspare Spontini, Giacomo Meyerbeer and Franz Berwald, and also extensively contributed to reference works on singers and other operatic topics, including several hundred articles in the Grove Dictionary of Music and Musicians.

She died on 22 October 2014.

References

1924 births
2014 deaths
English musicologists
Women musicologists
English music critics
English women non-fiction writers
People from Camberley
Women writers about music
20th-century English non-fiction writers
20th-century English women writers
21st-century English writers
21st-century English women writers
Women music critics
English translators
20th-century British translators
21st-century British translators
20th-century British musicologists
21st-century musicologists